Avo Keel (born 1 October 1962) is an Estonian volleyball coach and former player. He currently coaches Pärnu.

Sporting achievements

References

External links
 
 
 
 
 

1962 births
Living people
Volleyball coaches of international teams
Estonian volleyball coaches
Sportspeople from Võru
Soviet men's volleyball players
Estonian men's volleyball players
Recipients of the Order of the White Star, 4th Class
Estonian beach volleyball players
Men's beach volleyball players
Beach volleyball players at the 1996 Summer Olympics
Olympic beach volleyball players of Estonia
Estonian expatriate volleyball players
Expatriate volleyball players in Finland
Estonian expatriate sportspeople in Finland
Estonian expatriate sportspeople in Latvia